The Manifesto of Futurism (Italian: Manifesto del Futurismo) is a manifesto written by the Italian poet Filippo Tommaso Marinetti and published in 1909. Marinetti expresses an artistic philosophy called Futurism that was a rejection of the past and a celebration of speed, machinery, violence, youth and industry. It also advocated the modernization and cultural rejuvenation of Italy.

Publication
Marinetti wrote the manifesto in the autumn of 1908 and it first appeared as a preface to a volume of his poems, published in Milan in January 1909. It was published in the Italian newspaper Gazzetta dell'Emilia in Bologna on 5 February 1909, then in French as Manifeste du futurisme (Manifesto of Futurism) in the newspaper Le Figaro on 20 February 1909. Marinetti's Poesia focused its April 1909 issue on the manifesto and the Italian and French version were reprinted together with English version. In April 1909 a Madrid-based magazine, Prometeo, published the Spanish translation of the manifesto which was translated by Ramón Gómez de la Serna.

Contents 
The limits of Italian literature at the end of the so-called Ottocento (19th century), its lack of strong contents, its quiet and passive laissez-faire , were fought by futurists (see article 1, 2 and 3) and their reaction included the use of excesses intended to prove the existence of a dynamic surviving Italian intellectual class.

In this period in which industry was of growing importance across Europe, futurists needed to confirm that Italy was present, had an industry, had the power to take part in new experiences and would find the superior essence of progress in its major symbols like the car and its speed (see article 4). Nationalism was never openly declared, but it was evident.

Futurists insisted that literature would not be overtaken by progress, rather it would absorb progress in its evolution and would demonstrate that such progress must manifest in this manner because man would use this progress to sincerely let his instinctive nature explode. Man was reacting against the potentially overwhelming strength of progress and shouted out his centrality. Man would use speed, not the opposite (see articles 5 and 6).

Poetry would help man to consent that his soul be part of all that (see articles 6 and 7), indicating a new concept of beauty that would refer to the human instinct of aggression.

The sense of history cannot be neglected as this was a special moment, many things were going to change into new forms and new contents, but man would be able to pass through these variations (see article 8), bringing with himself what comes from the beginning of civilization.

In article 9, war is defined as a necessity for the health of human spirit, a purification that allows and benefits idealism. Their explicit glorification of war and its "hygienic" properties influenced the ideology of fascism. Marinetti was very active in fascist politics until he withdrew in protest of the "Roman Grandeur" which had come to dominate fascist aesthetics.

Article 10 states: "We want to demolish museums and libraries, fight morality, feminism and all opportunist and utilitarian cowardice".

Meaning 
This manifesto was published well before the occurrence of any of the 20th-century events which are commonly suggested as a potential meaning of this text. Many of them could not even be imagined yet. For example, the Russian Revolutions of 1917 were the first successfully maintained revolution of the sort described by article 11. The series of smaller scale peasant uprisings that had been known as the Russian Revolution previous to the occurrences of 1917 took place in the years immediately before the manifesto's publication and instigated the State Duma's creation of a Russian constitution in 1906.

The effect of the manifesto is even more evident in the Italian version. Not one of the words used is casual; if not the precise form, at least the roots of these words recall those more frequently used during the Middle Ages, particularly during the Rinascimento.

The founding manifesto did not contain a positive artistic programme, which the Futurists attempted to create in their subsequent Technical Manifesto of Futurist Painting (1914). This committed them to a "universal dynamism", which was to be directly represented in painting. Objects in reality were not separate from one another or from their surroundings: "The sixteen people around you in a rolling motor bus are in turn and at the same time one, ten four three; they are motionless and they change places. ... The motor bus rushes into the houses which it passes, and in their turn the houses throw themselves upon the motor bus and are blended with it".

See also 
 Futurist The Art of Noises Manifesto of Noise Music
 Futurist Painting: Technical Manifesto
 Du "Cubisme" Manifesto of Cubism
 Fascist Manifesto
 Art manifesto

References

External links 

 Poesia (magazine) Volume 5, Number 6, April 1909 English, French and Italian version of the manifesto (foreword/short story present in Le Figaro version is not included)
 English translation of the manifesto from the appendix of James Joll, Three intellectuals in politics, 1960 (foreword/short story is included)
 Futurist manifestos, 1909–1933
 Félix Del Marle, Le Manifeste futuriste à Montmartre, Comoedia, 18 July 1913 (French)
 Giovanni Lista, Futurisme. Manifestes, proclamations, documents, L'Âge d'Homme, 30 November 1973
 "The Founding and Manifesto of Futurism" 

Futurism
Italian culture
Art manifestos
1909 documents
Works by Filippo Tommaso Marinetti
Works originally published in Le Figaro
1909 in Italy
Italian literary movements